In mathematics, the height of an element g of an abelian group A is an invariant that captures its divisibility properties: it is the largest natural number N such that the equation Nx = g has a solution x ∈ A, or the symbol ∞ if there is no such N. The  p-height considers only divisibility properties by the powers of a fixed prime number p. The notion of height admits a refinement so that the p-height becomes an ordinal number. Height plays an important role in Prüfer theorems and also in Ulm's theorem, which describes the classification of certain infinite abelian groups in terms of their Ulm factors or Ulm invariants.

Definition of height 

Let A be an abelian group and g an element of A. The  p-height of g in A, denoted hp(g), is the largest natural number n such that the equation pnx = g has a solution in x ∈ A, or the symbol ∞ if a solution exists for all n. Thus hp(g) = n if and only if g ∈ pnA and g ∉ pn+1A. 
This allows one to refine the notion of height.

For any ordinal α, there is a subgroup pαA of A which is the image of the multiplication map by p iterated α times, defined using
transfinite induction:

 p0A = A;
 pα+1A = p(pαA);
 pβA=∩α < β pαA if β is a limit ordinal.

The subgroups pαA form a decreasing filtration of the group A, and their intersection is the subgroup of the p-divisible elements of A, whose elements are assigned height ∞. The modified p-height hp∗(g) = α if g ∈ pαA, but g ∉ pα+1A. The construction of pαA is functorial in A; in particular, subquotients of the filtration are isomorphism invariants of A.

Ulm subgroups 

Let p be a fixed prime number. The (first) Ulm subgroup of an abelian group A, denoted U(A) or A1, is pωA = ∩n pnA, where ω is the smallest infinite ordinal. It consists of all elements of A of infinite height. The family {Uσ(A)} of Ulm subgroups indexed by ordinals σ is defined by transfinite induction:

 U0(A) = A;
 Uσ+1(A) = U(Uσ(A));
 Uτ(A) = ∩σ < τ Uσ(A) if τ is a limit ordinal.

Equivalently, Uσ(A) = pωσA, where ωσ is the product of ordinals ω and σ.

Ulm subgroups form a decreasing filtration of A whose quotients  Uσ(A) = Uσ(A)/Uσ+1(A) are called the Ulm factors of A. This filtration stabilizes and the smallest ordinal τ such that Uτ(A) = Uτ+1(A) is the Ulm length of A. The smallest Ulm subgroup Uτ(A), also denoted U∞(A) and p∞A, is the largest p-divisible subgroup of A; if A is a p-group, then U∞(A) is divisible, and as such it is a direct summand of A.
  
For every Ulm factor Uσ(A) the p-heights of its elements are finite and they are unbounded for every Ulm factor except possibly the last one, namely Uτ−1(A) when the Ulm length τ is a successor ordinal.

Ulm's theorem 

The second Prüfer theorem provides a straightforward extension of the fundamental theorem of finitely generated abelian groups to countable abelian p-groups without elements of infinite height: each such group is isomorphic to a direct sum of cyclic groups whose orders are powers of p. Moreover, the cardinality of the set of summands of order pn is uniquely determined by the group and each sequence of at most countable cardinalities is realized. Helmut Ulm (1933) found an extension of this classification theory to general countable p-groups: their isomorphism class is determined by the isomorphism classes of the Ulm factors and the p-divisible part.

 Ulm's theorem. Let A and B be countable abelian p-groups such that for every ordinal σ their Ulm factors are isomorphic, Uσ(A) ≅ Uσ(B) and the p-divisible parts of A and B are isomorphic, U∞(A) ≅ U∞(B). Then A and B are isomorphic.

There is a complement to this theorem, first stated by Leo Zippin (1935) and proved in Kurosh (1960), which addresses the existence of an abelian p-group with given Ulm factors.

 Let τ be an ordinal and {Aσ} be a family of countable abelian p-groups indexed by the ordinals σ < τ such that the p-heights of elements of each Aσ are finite and, except possibly for the last one, are unbounded. Then there exists a reduced abelian p-group A of Ulm length τ whose Ulm factors are isomorphic to these p-groups, Uσ(A) ≅ Aσ.

Ulm's original proof was based on an extension of the theory of elementary divisors to infinite matrices.

Alternative formulation 

George Mackey and Irving Kaplansky generalized Ulm's theorem to certain modules over a complete discrete valuation ring. They introduced invariants of abelian groups that lead to a direct statement of the classification of countable periodic abelian groups: given an abelian group A, a prime p, and an ordinal α, the corresponding  αth Ulm invariant is the dimension of the quotient

 pαA[p]/pα+1A[p],

where B[p] denotes the p-torsion of an abelian group B, i.e. the subgroup of elements of order p, viewed as a vector space over the finite field with p elements.

 A countable periodic reduced abelian group is determined uniquely up to isomorphism by its Ulm invariants for all prime numbers p and countable ordinals α.

Their simplified proof of Ulm's theorem served as a model for many further generalizations to other classes of abelian groups and modules.

References 

 László Fuchs (1970), Infinite abelian groups, Vol. I. Pure and Applied Mathematics, Vol. 36. New York–London: Academic Press 
 Irving Kaplansky and George Mackey, A generalization of Ulm's theorem. Summa Brasil. Math. 2, (1951), 195–202 

 

Abelian group theory
Infinite group theory